Heterognatha is a genus of South American orb-weaver spiders containing the single species, Heterognatha chilensis. It was first described by H. Nicolet in 1849, and has only been found in Chile.

References

Araneidae
Monotypic Araneomorphae genera
Spiders of South America
Endemic fauna of Chile